Miss USA 2014 was the 63rd Miss USA pageant, held at the Raising Cane's River Center Arena in Baton Rouge, Louisiana on June 8, 2014. All fifty states and the District of Columbia competed. The preliminary competition was not webcast live for the first time in five years, but excerpts were distributed post-competition via website Hulu. The final night of competition was televised on NBC.

Erin Brady of Connecticut, crowned her successor Nia Sanchez of Nevada. This was Nevada's first Miss USA title. Sanchez represented the United States on home soil at Miss Universe 2014 and finished 1st Runner-Up.

The date and venue was revealed by Donald Trump, co-owner of the Miss Universe Organization, and Brady on March 13, 2014, during Today. However, it was reported that the delegates will be staying at the L'Auberge Casino and Hotel in Baton Rouge ahead of this announcement.

For the first time, the final telecast was three hours long, with the additional hour including a look at the top 20 (rather than 15) in their home states. The top 20 competed in swimsuits, then eliminated by the judges to a top ten. The top ten competed in evening gown, then judges eliminated to a final five, along with a sixth finalist selected from the remaining contestants in the top ten via a Twitter fan vote (texting #SAVETHEQUEEN).

This was the last Miss USA to be aired on NBC.

Background

Selection of contestants
One delegate from each state and the District of Columbia was chosen in state pageants held which began in July 2013 and ended in January 2014. The first state pageant was Florida, held on July 13, 2013 as scheduled. The final pageant was New Hampshire, held on January 23, 2014.

Twelve delegates are former Miss Teen USA state winners, surpassing the previous number of eleven former teens in Miss USA 2007, while two are former Miss America's Outstanding Teen state winners.

Preliminary round
Prior to the final telecast, the delegates competed in the preliminary competition, which involves private interviews with the judges and a presentation show where they compete in swimsuit and evening gown. The preliminary competition took place on June 6, 2014.

Finals
During the final competition, the top twenty competed in swimsuit and evening gown, and the top five competed in the final question signed up by a panel of judges.

Results

Placements

§ Voted into Top 6 after the evening gown competition via Twitter

Special awards

Order of announcements

Top 20

Top 10

Top 6

Contestants
51 contestants were confirmed. The information from Miss USA Official website

Judges
Preliminary judges: 
 Bryce Townsend
 Carole Gist - Miss USA 1990 from Michigan
 Chantal "Taly" Russell 
 Elise Zealand
 Fred Nelson
 Janna Ronert 
 Jeanne Burns 
 Scott Balber

Telecast Judges:
 Rumer Willis
 Allie LaForce - Miss Teen USA 2005 from Ohio
 Bárbara Palacios - Miss Universe 1986 from Venezuela
 Ian Ziering
 Randy Couture
 Melissa Peterman
 Lance Bass
 Karl Malone
 Dolvett Quince

Background music
Opening  – "Iko Iko," "Take A Ride On A Riverboat," "Home," and "Hey Pocky A-Way" by Marc Broussard featuring Dirty Dozen Brass Band Horns (Live Performance)
Swimsuit Competition – "Cruise" by Florida Georgia Line featuring Nelly (Live Performance)
Evening Gown Competition – "Decidiste dejarme" and "Tu tiempo ya se fue" by Camila (Live Performance)
Top 6 Final Look – "This Is How We Roll" by Florida Georgia Line (Live Performance)

Historical significance 
 Nevada wins competition for the first time and surpasses its previous highest placement in 1977. Also becoming in the 33rd state who does it for the first time.
 North Dakota earns the 1st runner-up position for the first time, surpassing its previous highest placement in 1966 and reaches its highest placement ever in the pageant.
 Georgia earns the 2nd runner-up position for the fifth time and repeats its highest placement from the last time 2006.
 Louisiana earns the 3rd runner-up position for the fifth time and reaches its highest placement since Ali Landry won in 1996. This was last placed in 1989.
 Florida earns the 4th runner-up position for the fifth time and repeats its highest placement from the last time 2006.
 Iowa earns the 5th runner-up position for the first time and reaches its highest placement in 58 years, since the win by Carol Morris in 1956. Incidentally, Morris went on to become the second woman from the USA to win the Miss Universe title in 1956.
 States that placed in semifinals the previous year were Alabama, California, Louisiana, Maryland, Nevada, Pennsylvania and South Carolina. 
 Alabama placed for the fifth consecutive year.
 Maryland and South Carolina placed for the fourth consecutive year.
 Louisiana and Nevada placed for the third consecutive year.
 California and Pennsylvania made their second consecutive placement.
 Georgia, New Jersey, Oklahoma and Tennessee last placed in 2012.
 Arizona, Florida, and Indiana last placed in 2011.
 Nebraska and Virginia last placed in 2010.
 Minnesota last placed in 2009.
 Wisconsin last placed in 2007.
 Iowa last placed in 2000.
 North Dakota last placed in 1996.
 Ohio breaks an ongoing streak of placements since 2012.
 Texas breaks an ongoing streak of placements since 2011.
 This is the third year in a row a state wins its first Miss USA title (Nevada, Connecticut, and Rhode Island), including Olivia Culpo's win in 2012.
 Audra Mari of North Dakota becomes the first person to finish 1st Runner-Up at both Miss Teen USA (in 2011) and Miss USA.  She is only eclipsed in both national pageants by Shauna Gambill (Miss Teen USA 1994/Miss USA 1998 1st Runner-Up, Brandi Sherwood (Miss Teen USA 1989/Miss USA 1997 replacement) and Alyssa Campanella (Miss Teen USA 2007 1st Runner-Up / Miss USA 2011).

International broadcasters

Television
United States: NBC
Africa: DSTV Mzansi Magic (delayed broadcast)
Asia: Star World (delayed broadcast)

Notes

References

External links

 Miss USA official website

2014
June 2014 events in the United States
2014 beauty pageants
Beauty pageants in the United States
2014 in Louisiana
NBC original programming
Baton Rouge, Louisiana